The 2011 Seattle Seahawks season was the franchise's 36th season in the National Football League (NFL), the 10th playing their home games at CenturyLink Field (formerly known as Qwest Field) and the second under head coach Pete Carroll. It was the first season in over a decade in which the Seahawks came into the season with a new starting quarterback, as incumbent Matt Hasselbeck left for the Tennessee Titans in free agency. The Seahawks equaled their 7–9 record in 2010, but failed to defend their NFC West division title and missed the playoffs. This year was notable for the emergence of the Legion of Boom defensive group.

Until 2021, this was the last season the Seahawks finished with a losing record.

Offseason

2011 NFL Draft

Draft notes

Coaching staff

Final roster

     Starters in bold.
 (*) Denotes players that were selected for the 2012 Pro Bowl.

Preseason

Schedule

Regular season

Schedule

Bold indicates division opponents.
Source: 2011 NFL season results

Standings

Game Summaries

Preseason

Week P1: at San Diego Chargers

Week P2: vs. Minnesota Vikings

Week P3: at Denver Broncos

Week P4: vs. Oakland Raiders

Regular season

Week 1: at San Francisco 49ers

With the loss, the Seahawks started the season 0–1.

Week 2: at Pittsburgh Steelers

The Seahawks were shut out for the first time since 2007 and for the 2nd consecutive game by the Steelers (The teams faced each other in 2007 in which the Steelers became victorious with a 21–0 win.) The team fell to 0–2 on the season.

Week 3: vs. Arizona Cardinals

With the win, the Seahawks improved to 1–2.

Week 4: vs. Atlanta Falcons

With the loss, the Seahawks fell to 1–3.

Week 5: at New York Giants

With the win, the Seahawks went into their bye week at 2–3.

Week 7: at Cleveland Browns

With the loss, the Seahawks fell to 2–4.

Week 8: vs. Cincinnati Bengals

With the loss, the Seahawks fell to 2–5. This would be their last home loss to an AFC opponent until a 25-17 defeat against the Los Angeles Chargers in 2018.

Week 9: at Dallas Cowboys

With the loss, the Seahawks fell to 2–6. This is the last game the Seahawks would lose by double digits until the Week 2 game against the Packers in the 2015 season (including playoffs).

Week 10: vs. Baltimore Ravens

With the win, the Seahawks improved to 3–6.

Week 11: at St. Louis Rams

With the win, the Seahawks improved to 4–6.

Week 12: vs. Washington Redskins

With the loss, the Seahawks fell to 4–7.

Week 13: vs. Philadelphia Eagles

With the win, the Seahawks improved to 5–7.

Week 14: vs. St. Louis Rams

With the win, the Seahawks improved to 6–7 and swept the Rams for the first time since 2009 and embarked on working on another major winning streak against the team. Also, the Seahawks took the trend of winning 13 out of the last 14 games against the Rams dating back to 2005.

Week 15: at Chicago Bears

With the win, the Seahawks improved to 7–7.

Week 16: vs. San Francisco 49ers

With the loss, the Seahawks fell to 7–8 and were swept by the 49ers for the first time since 2006.

Week 17: at Arizona Cardinals

With the loss, the Seahawks finished the season 7–9 and 3rd place in the NFC West.

Notes and references

Seattle
Seattle Seahawks seasons
Seattle Seahawks